Abdul Karim Saleem Khasawneh (born 1944) is a Jordanian Muslim scholar who was Grand Mufti of Jordan between 23 February 2010 and 22 January 2017. Since then, he has been the chief Islamic justice.

Career
Khasawneh was born in 1944 in Irbid Governorate. In 1973, he earned a degree at Damascus University and worked there as well. He returned to Jordan and eventually became Mufti of the Jordanian Armed Forces, and served as a Major General. In this capacity he was present at the International Islamic Conference, 2005. In February 2010, he succeeded Noah Qudah as Grand Mufti of Jordan.

In November 2011, he was present at the Second Muslim Catholic Forum, an interreligious initiative started after the 2007 open letter A Common Word Between Us and You.

On 22 January 2017, Khasawneh was named chief Islamic justice of Jordan, succeeding Ahmad Hilayel. He was succeeded as Grand Mufti by Mohammad Khalaileh.

Khasawneh is a member of the Jordanian Ifta Council and member of the board of the World Islamic Sciences and Education University.

See also 
 2016 international conference on Sunni Islam in Grozny

References

1944 births
Living people
People from Irbid Governorate
Jordanian Sunni Muslims
Jordanian religious leaders
Grand Muftis of Jordan
Damascus University alumni
Academic staff of Damascus University
Jordanian military personnel
Jordanian generals
21st-century Islamic religious leaders